The 2013 CEV Moto3 season was the second season using Moto3 bikes, the title was claimed by 14-year-old Frenchman Fabio Quartararo by a single point from Marcos Ramírez. María Herrera became the first female rider to win a CEV race.

Calendar

Championship standings

Scoring system
Points are awarded to the top fifteen finishers. A rider has to finish the race to earn points.

FIM CEV Moto3 Junior World Championship
CEV Moto3
CEV Moto3